Prince Franciszek Sebastian Lubomirski (died 1699) was a Polish noble (szlachcic).

Lubomirski was the son of Grand Marshal and Hetman Jerzy Sebastian Lubomirski and Barbara Tarło. He was the owner of Łańcut, the starost of Olsztyn, and the Rotmistrz of an armoured cavalry regiment (Chorągiew pancerna).

17th-century births
1699 deaths
Franciszek Sebastian Lubomirski
17th-century Polish landowners